Arcot Lutheran Church is a Christian denomination in India. It has about 40,000 members. It belongs to National Council of Churches in India, United Evangelical Lutheran Church in India, Lutheran World Federation and World Council of Churches. The Bishop and the President  of this church is Rt. Rev. V. Samuel Kennady Its headquarters are in Cuddalore, Tamil Nadu.
The other churches belonging to the United Evangelical Lutheran Church in India are:

Andhra Evangelical Lutheran Church
Evangelical Lutheran Church in Madhya Pradesh
Evangelical Lutheran Church in the Himalayan States
Good Samaritan Evangelical Lutheran Church
Gossner Evangelical Lutheran Church in Chotanagpur and Assam
Indian Evangelical Lutheran Church
Jeypore Evangelical Lutheran Church
Northern Evangelical Lutheran Church
South Andhra Lutheran Church
Tamil Evangelical Lutheran Church

See also
Christianity in Tamil Nadu

References

External links
Website of the United Evangelical Lutheran Church in India

Lutheran World Federation members
Lutheranism in India
Affiliated institutions of the National Council of Churches in India